"The Library" is the 22nd episode of the American NBC sitcom Seinfeld. It was the fifth episode of the show's third season.

Plot
Jerry learns he has a library fine from 1971, for the then-controversial book Tropic of Cancer, and that the "case" has been turned over to the library investigations officer, Lt. Bookman. George arrives at the library, and suspects that the homeless man on the steps outside is Mr. Heyman, a physical education teacher at his high school whom he reported for giving him a wedgie, which got him fired. Jerry pays Mr. Bookman, and Heyman holds the dilapidated long-lost copy of Tropic of Cancer at the alleyway. Kramer flirts with the librarian, Marion, starting a forbidden affair with her.

Elaine is concerned that Mr. Lippman is planning to fire her, so after she sees Kramer crying over Marion's poetry, she takes some of it, trying unsuccessfully to impress Lippman with a new literary find.

Reception 
Philip Baker Hall's role as a lieutenant, whom he played in imitation of Jack Webb's Sergeant Joe Friday of Dragnet fame, was very well received. It was considered to be one of the best guest appearances on Seinfeld, and led to Hall receiving many other offers of work. It was rated as one of his most memorable performances. When the New York Public Library decided to eliminate late fees in October 2021, it posted a satiric piece in its blog, supposedly written by another character of that episode (Sherry Becker), wishing Mr. Bookman a happy retirement.

References

External links
 

1991 American television episodes
Seinfeld (season 3) episodes
Works set in libraries